Joseph Jacques Yanick Dupré (November 20, 1972 – August 16, 1997) was a Canadian professional ice hockey left winger who played 35 games over parts of three seasons in the National Hockey League (NHL) for the Philadelphia Flyers. He died at the age of 24 after a 16-month battle with leukemia. 

The Yanick Dupre Memorial Class Guy Award was named after him to honour his memory and is given to the Flyer who best illustrates character, dignity, and respect for the sport both on and off the ice. A similarly named award is also presented by the American Hockey League in recognition of a player's community service.

Career statistics

See also
List of ice hockey players who died during their playing career

References

External links
 

1972 births
1997 deaths
Canadian ice hockey left wingers
Chicoutimi Saguenéens (QMJHL) players
Deaths from cancer in Quebec
Deaths from leukemia
Drummondville Voltigeurs players
Hershey Bears players
Ice hockey people from Montreal
Philadelphia Flyers draft picks
Philadelphia Flyers players
Verdun Collège Français players